"Bésame sin miedo" (English: "Kiss me without fear") is a song recorded by Mexican pop group RBD for their third studio album Celestial (2006). The Portuguese version of the song appears on Celestial (Versão Brasil) (2006).

Release
"Bésame Sin Miedo" is the third worldwide single from the RBD album Celestial (2006). The song went to Latin radio stations in early August. The song was promoted more than the previous single "Celestial" in the U.S, with the band touring in the U.S.. In the U.S, the group premiered the song on the 2007 Premios Juventud.

Music video
The video for the song was shot in Transylvania while the group was touring in Europe. The official music video was shot on June 13 at Bran Castle, better known as Dracula's Castle, in Transylvania, Romania. The music video was released August 28, 2007 in OpenDisc and was officially released on August 29, 2007 in the Official RBD website.
The video starts off with RBD in a bus on the way to Dracula's Castle. On the way, the guys pick up some girls and take them with them. In the Castle, the group sits around playing "spin the bottle," and then begin kissing their romantic partners one by one. It ends with Anahi getting bit by a vampire.

Chart performance
In its second week on the chart, the song was bulleted to number on the Billboard Latin Pop Airplay. It has reached the number 8 position for two weeks ever since,  dropping one position when Juanes' "Me Enamora" debuted at number 1.

Charts

References

2007 singles
RBD songs
Spanish-language songs
Songs written by Chico Bennett
Songs written by Carlos Lara (songwriter)
2006 songs
EMI Records singles
Articles containing video clips